In chemistry, a quaternary compound is a compound consisting of exactly four chemical elements. 

In another use of the term in organic chemistry, a quaternary compound is or has a cation consisting of a central positively charged atom with four substituents, especially organic (alkyl and aryl) groups, discounting hydrogen atoms.

The best-known quaternary compounds are quaternary ammonium salts, having a nitrogen atom at the centre. For example, in the following reaction, the nitrogen atom is said to be quaternized as it has gone from 3 to 4 substituents:

R3N + RCl -> R4N+Cl-

Other examples include substituted phosphonium salts, substituted arsonium salts like arsenobetaine, as well as some arsenic-containing superconductors. Substituted stibonium and bismuthonium salts have also been described.

See also
Binary compound
Ternary compound
Onium ion
Quaternary phase

References